Chromium(II) bromide is the inorganic compound with the chemical formula CrBr2.  Like many metal dihalides, CrBr2 adopts the "cadmium iodide structure" motif, i.e., it features sheets of octahedral Cr(II) centers interconnected by bridging bromide ligands. It is a white solid that dissolves in water to give blue solutions that are readily oxidized by air.

Synthesis and reactions
It can be prepared by reduction of chromium(III) bromide with hydrogen gas for 6–10 hours at 350-400 °C, cogenerating hydrogen bromide:
2CrBr3  +  H2  →   2CrBr2  +  2HBr

Treatment of chromium powder with concentrated hydrobromic acid gives a blue hydrated chromium(II) bromide, which can be converted to a related acetonitrile complex.
Cr +  nH2O  +  2HBr  →   CrBr2(H2O)n  +  H2

References

Chromium(II) compounds
Bromides
Metal halides